NGC 7318 (also known as UGC 12099/UGC 12100 or HCG 92d/b) is a pair of colliding galaxies about 280 million light-years from Earth. They appear in the Constellation Pegasus and are members of Stephan's Quintet.

The Spitzer Space Telescope revealed the presence of a large intergalactic shock wave, shown by an arc produced by NGC 7318b colliding with the group at ≥ 900 km/sec.  As NGC 7318b collides with NGC 7318a, atoms of hydrogen in the cluster's gas are heated by the shock wave, producing the green glow.  The molecular hydrogen visible in the collision is one of the  most turbulent forms known.  This phenomenon was discovered by an international team of scientists of the Max Planck Institute for Nuclear Physics (MPIK) in Heidelberg.  This collision can help provide a view into what happened in the early universe, around 10 billion years ago.

References

External links
 
 Hickson 92 in Pegasus
 SIMBAD: VV 288 -- Interacting Galaxies
 SIMBAD: UGC 12100—Interacting Galaxies

Barred spiral galaxies
Interacting galaxies
Elliptical galaxies
Peculiar galaxies
Stephan's Quintet
Pegasus (constellation)
7318
12099
69260
319